The 1995–96 season was FC Dinamo București's 47th season in Divizia A. Dinamo finished 5th in the league and reached the quarter-finals of the Romanian Cup. Dinamo had 15 new players during the season.

Players

Squad information
Squad at end of season

League table

Results 
Dinamo's score comes first

Legend

Divizia A

Cupa României

UEFA Cup

Levski Sofia won 2–1 on aggregate.

References

External links 
 RomanianSoccer.ro
 WorldFootball.net
 RSSSF.com
 labtof.ro

FC Dinamo București seasons
Romanian football clubs 1995–96 season